"You Better Keep It on Your Mind" is a song by Hank Williams.  It was composed by Williams and Vic McAlpin and released as a posthumous single by Williams in 1954 on MGM Records.  The B-side was "Low Down Blues."  McAplin was a staff songwriter at Acuff-Rose and had made minor contributions to Hank's "Long Gone Lonesome Blues" while the pair went on a fishing trip. Thematically, "You Better Keep It on Your Mind" is similar to "You're Gonna Change (Or I'm Gonna Leave)," with the narrator warning his significant other to take him seriously.  The second voice on the recording is speculated to be Hank Snow.

Discography

References

Hank Williams songs
1954 singles
Songs written by Hank Williams
1952 songs
MGM Records singles